Jean Alfazema Nachika Kalilani is a Malawian politician who has served in the Cabinet of Malawi as Minister of Home Affairs and Internal Security since 2015. Previously she was Minister of Health from 2014 to 2015. She is also the Secretary General of the Democratic Progressive Party  (DPP) and second term Member of Parliament for Dowa Central Constituency.  As an MP, she served as the Women's Caucus Chair and as the International Relations Chair in the National Assembly. She previously worked for the World Health Organization in Botswana as a country representative.

After DPP candidate Peter Mutharika was elected President, he appointed Kalilani as Minister of Health in June 2014. She was moved to the post of Minister of Home Affairs and Internal Security in August 2015.

She is also the mother of recording artist Tay Grin.

References

Living people
1947 births
Government ministers of Malawi
Health ministers of Malawi
Members of the National Assembly (Malawi)
Women government ministers of Malawi
Malawi Congress Party politicians